Ridwan Tawainella  (born 15 May 1995) is an Indonesian professional footballer who plays as a winger for Liga 2 club Bekasi City. Ridwan was born in Tulehu, where the village is known as the village who gave birth to many national football players.

Club career

PSM Makassar
November 2015, Ridwan with other players from Maluku, Risman, signed a contract as a PSM Makassar player.

Ridwan managed to steal the public's attention while playing for PSM Makassar in 2015 Sudirman Cup. First time for Ridwan joined to the Indonesia Super League club like a PSM Makassar and playing in the national level.

Arema
He was signed for Arema to play in Liga 1 in the 2018 season. Tawainella made his debut on 31 March 2018 in a match against Persija Jakarta. On 21 July 2018, Tawainella scored his first goal for Arema against Sriwijaya in the 51st minute at the Gelora Sriwijaya Stadium, Palembang.

Bekasi City
On 5 June 2022, it was announced that Saldi would be joining Bekasi City for the 2022-23 Liga 2 campaign.

Career statistics

Club

Honours

Club
Arema
 Indonesia President's Cup: 2019

References

External links
 
 Ridwan Tawainella at Liga Indonesia

1995 births
Indonesian footballers
Living people
People from Tulehu
Sportspeople from Maluku (province)
PSM Makassar players
Arema F.C. players
Liga 1 (Indonesia) players
Association football midfielders